The 2006 World University Squash Championship is the edition of the 2006's World University Squash, which serves as the individual world squash championship for students. The event will take place in Szeged, Hungary, from 28 August to 2 September.

Draw and results

Men's Single

Women's Single

Team Event

See also
World University Squash Championships
World Squash Federation

References

External links
SquashSite World University 2006 website

Sport in Szeged
World University
World University Squash Championships
World University Squash Championships
Squash